Mônica da Silva (born 9 August 1960) is a Brazilian volleyball player. She competed in the women's tournament at the 1984 Summer Olympics.

References

External links
 

1960 births
Living people
Brazilian women's volleyball players
Olympic volleyball players of Brazil
Volleyball players at the 1984 Summer Olympics
Volleyball players from Rio de Janeiro (city)
Pan American Games medalists in volleyball
Pan American Games bronze medalists for Brazil
Medalists at the 1979 Pan American Games